The Third Amendment of the Constitution Act 1972 is an amendment to the Constitution of Ireland that permitted the State to join the European Communities, which would later become the European Union, and provided that European Community law would take precedence over the constitution. It was approved by referendum on 10 May 1972, and signed into law by the President of Ireland Éamon de Valera on 8 June of the same year.

The incorporation of the law of the European Communities into Irish domestic law was put into effect by the European Communities Act 1972, which became law on the day Ireland acceded to the European Communities on 1 January 1973.

Background

Belgium, France, West Germany, Italy, Luxembourg and the Netherlands formed the European Coal and Steel Community in 1951. In 1957, the same six countries formed the European Economic Community and European Atomic Energy Community. Together, these were known as the European Communities and shared common institutions.

In 1961, Ireland applied to join the European Communities. This application was withdrawn after President of France Charles de Gaulle exercised a veto in respect of the application of the United Kingdom. A second application was made in 1967, and in 1972, the six member states signed a Treaty of Accession with Denmark, Ireland, Norway and the United Kingdom. As Ireland had no nuclear power programme, nor any important coal and steel industries, membership of the Communities primarily concerned the European Economic Community.

In Costa v ENEL (1964), the European Court of Justice established the primacy of European Community law. Therefore, an amendment was needed in order to avoid a conflict with the Constitution of Ireland, which had granted powers exclusively to the Oireachtas (parliament) and the Government of Ireland. It was also possible that many provisions of the Constitution might be found to be incompatible with European law.

Changes to the text
Addition of a new subsection to Article 29.4 of the Constitution:

Oireachtas debate
The Third Amendment of the Constitution Bill 1971 was introduced in the Dáil by Tánaiste Erskine H. Childers of Fianna Fáil. Among the opposition parties, it was supported by Fine Gael and opposed by the Labour Party. At the Second Stage debates, it was moved by Taoiseach Jack Lynch. The Labour Party sought to defeat the reading of the bill at second stage; a government motion to prevent this passed by 106 votes to 17, and the bill proceeded to Committee Stage. At Committee Stage, the government accepted a Fine Gael amendment to the final sentence. As initiated, this sentence had begun, "No provision of this Constitution invalidates laws enacted, acts done or measures adopted by the State consequent on membership of the Communities […]"; the amendment replaced the words highlighted in bold with the words "necessitated by the obligations of". It passed all stages in the Dáil on 26 January 1972. It passed all stages in the Seanad on 8 March 1972.

Views on accession
As well as parties represented in the Oireachtas, accession was also supported by employers' and farmers' interest groups. President Éamon de Valera privately opposed the state's entry and voted 'no', citing the loss of sovereignty.

Official Sinn Féin  opposed the state's entry, citing anti-imperialism and calling the EC a "rich man's club". Provisional Sinn Féin also opposed the entry, saying it would undermine Irish sovereignty and that the "Common Market Empire would threaten Irish ownership of Irish land".

Result
The Third Amendment was approved with 83.1% in favour to 16.9% against. It was the first amendment to the Constitution to be approved by Irish voters in a referendum.

Aftermath and later developments
The European Communities Act 1972 was signed into law on 6 December 1972. This provided a legislative basis for the primacy and direct effect of European Community law. On 1 January 1973, Ireland, Denmark and the United Kingdom became member states of the European Communities (Norway had rejected membership in a referendum).

Unlike in the United Kingdom where the issue of membership to the European Communities was the subject of fierce political debate for decades which would eventually lead to Brexit in 2020 after a referendum was held in 2016 which ended 47 years of British membership in Ireland the outcome of the referendum on the Third Amendment immediately settled the issue of Ireland's place in Europe amongst both the Irish people and its politicians and in the decades that followed Irish support for continued membership would in fact continue to grow.

In Crotty v. An Taoiseach (1987), the Supreme Court of Ireland held that further transfer of power to the European Communities that were not in themselves necessitated by membership of the European Communities (in that instance, approval of the Single European Act) would require further amendments to the Constitution, and therefore require approval by referendum. Subsequent changes to the Treaties of the European Communities and later of the European Union have also required amendments to the Constitution, and therefore have required approval by referendum. These amendments have substantially altered the initial wording of 29.4.3º as inserted by the Third Amendment. in particular, the Twenty-eighth Amendment of the Constitution of Ireland approved in 2009, allowing the ratification of the Treaty of Lisbon, created a different structure to the subsections in Article 29.4.

In later years the various European organisations (with the exception of EAEC) were integrated by the ratification of subsequent treaties into the European Union.

See also
Politics of the Republic of Ireland
History of the Republic of Ireland
Law of the Republic of Ireland

References

External links
Third Amendment of the Constitution Act, 1972
Full text of the Constitution of Ireland

1972 in international relations
1972 in Irish law
1972 in Irish politics
1972 referendums
03
Ireland Amendments of the Constitution
Ireland and the European Union
03c
Referendums related to European Union accession
May 1972 events in Europe
Amendment, 03